Paweł Ludwik Skrzecz (born 25 August 1957 in Warsaw) is a retired boxer from Poland, who won the silver medal in the light heavyweight division (– 81 kg) at the 1980 Summer Olympics in Moscow, Soviet Union. In the final he was beaten by Slobodan Kačar of Yugoslavia. Two years later he won the silver medal at the World Championships in Munich, West Germany.

Olympic results 
Below are the results of Pawel Skrzecz, a Polish light heavyweight boxer who competed at the 1980 Moscow Olympics:

Round of 16: Defeated Mohamed Bouchiche (Algeria) by walkover
Quarterfinal: Defeated Georgica Donici (Romania) by majority decision, 4–1
Semifinal: Defeated Ricardo Rojas (Cuba) by split decision, 3–2
Final: Lost to Slobodan Kačar (Yugoslavia) by majority decision, 1–4 (was awarded silver medal)

References
 databaseOlympics

1957 births
Living people
Light-heavyweight boxers
Boxers at the 1980 Summer Olympics
Olympic boxers of Poland
Olympic silver medalists for Poland
Olympic medalists in boxing
Boxers from Warsaw
Polish male boxers
AIBA World Boxing Championships medalists
Medalists at the 1980 Summer Olympics
Polish twins